Micro Center is an American computer retail store, headquartered in Hilliard, Ohio.

History
Micro Center was founded in Columbus, Ohio in 1979 by John Baker and Bill Bayne, two former Radio Shack employees, with a $35,000 investment. The first Micro Center store was established in a  storefront located in the Lane Avenue Shopping Center in Upper Arlington, Ohio. The store benefited from its proximity to Ohio State University and the scientific think-tank Battelle Memorial Institute, which provided a large customer base and a source of computer-literate salespeople. Their goal for the first year was $30 million in sales, and they achieved $29.9 million. In 2009, Micro Center developed an "18-minute pickup" service where customers who order merchandise on their website can pick it up from the store in 18 minutes.

In January 2014, the company planned to open two new New York City stores in Brooklyn and Queens.

, there are 25 Micro Center stores nationwide in 16 states, including California, Colorado, Georgia, Illinois, Kansas, Maryland, Massachusetts, Michigan, Minnesota, Missouri, New Jersey, New York, Ohio, Pennsylvania, Texas, and Virginia.

Corporate structure
Micro Center is a subsidiary of Micro Electronics, Inc., a privately held corporation headquartered in Hilliard, Ohio.

Micro Center is an approved seller of all Apple products. The company has had Apple departments in all stores since 1982, and has included "Build Your Own PC" departments, "Knowledge Bars" for service and support, and "Knowledge Theaters" for free classes on weekends since 2007.

Public profile
Micro Center was the first retailer in the United States to sell the DJI Mavic Pro drone, launching it by hosting a three-day demonstration in their Columbus store's parking lot which was open to the press and the public.

In a 2015 interview, Micro Center CEO Rick Mershad described how their product line is changing: the STEM movement is driving students and adults to make their own creations, and Micro Center is focusing on Arduino projects and Raspberry Pi, which require more consultative selling.

Media reception

Joan Verdon of The Record noted that meeting customer's needs with a high level of service and skilled salespeople are Micro Center's "claim to fame". She also quoted Doug Olenick, editor at TWICE, a major consumer electronics trade publication, who said that the store's salespeople, compared to others in the industry, are extremely well trained.

In 2021, the store started to offer a free solid-state drive to new customers, but Storage Review was not sold, concluding "it's free, but it's still not worth it". More generally, they noted that: "Micro Center's Inland brand is to tech what Amazon's dozens of brands are to toilet paper, shampoo, and such."

Awards and rankings
In 2014, Micro Center was ranked number 93 in the list of 100 hottest retailers in the US, compiled by the National Retail Federation.

In 2015, the industry trade journal Dealerscope ranked it as the 18th largest consumer electronics retailer in the United States and Canada.

In 2016, Forbes magazine ranked it 195th among America's largest private companies.

In October 2016, Micro Center stores won first and second prizes in Intel's annual "Score with Intel Core" competition, and donated their prize money to local schools.

In 2019, Micro Center stores won first and third prizes, making two more prize money donations to local schools.

See also 
According to the American business research company Hoover's, the major competitors to Micro Center's parent company Micro Electronics are:
 Best Buy
 Fry's Electronics (defunct)
 PC Connection
 Amazon.com

References

External links
 

Consumer electronics retailers in the United States
Consumer electronics retailers
Consumer electronics
Online retailers of the United States
Computer companies of the United States
Home computer hardware companies
American companies established in 1979
Computer companies established in 1979
Electronics companies established in 1979
Retail companies established in 1979
1979 establishments in Ohio
Retail companies based in Ohio
Privately held companies based in Ohio
Companies based in Franklin County, Ohio
Companies based in the Columbus, Ohio metropolitan area